Elaine Silburn (born 29 July 1928) is a Canadian athlete. She competed in the women's long jump and the women's high jump at the 1948 Summer Olympics. Her granddaughter, Katrina Young, participated at the 2016 Summer Olympics in the diving competition representing the United States.

References

1928 births
Living people
Athletes (track and field) at the 1948 Summer Olympics
Canadian female long jumpers
Canadian female high jumpers
Olympic track and field athletes of Canada
Athletes from Victoria, British Columbia
Athletes (track and field) at the 1950 British Empire Games
Commonwealth Games medallists in athletics
Commonwealth Games bronze medallists for Canada
Medallists at the 1950 British Empire Games